The 1927 Pottsville Maroons season was their third in the league. The team failed to improve on their previous league output of 10–2–2, winning only five games. They finished eighth in the league standings.

Schedule

Standings

References

1927
Pottsville Maroons
Boston